Rômulo da Silva Machado (born 10 January 1998) is a Brazilian professional footballer who plays as a midfielder for Criciúma, on loan from Portuguese club Portimonense.

Professional career
Rômulo made his professional debut with Londrina in a 3-0 Campeonato Brasileiro Série B loss to Internacional on 13 May 2017. On 14 June 2019, Rômulo joined on loan in the Primeira Liga.

References

External links
 

1998 births
Living people
People from Cascavel
Brazilian footballers
Association football midfielders
Londrina Esporte Clube players
Atlético Clube Goianiense players
Portimonense S.C. players
Grêmio Esportivo Brasil players
Criciúma Esporte Clube players
Campeonato Paranaense players
Campeonato Brasileiro Série B players
Primeira Liga players
Brazilian expatriate footballers
Expatriate footballers in Portugal
Brazilian expatriate sportspeople in Portugal
Sportspeople from Paraná (state)